Gerald's World is the fifth studio album by American R&B singer Gerald Levert. It was released by Elektra Records on September 18, 2001, in the United States.

Critical reception

In his review for AllMusic, David Jeffries called Gerald's World "another Gerald Levert album – nothing less, nothing more [...] On Gerald's World, he's as smooth and as sweet-talkin' as ever. But there's something automatic about it all, a sense of security with the persona and legend he's built over the years. LeVert still may have a bedroom voice, but more often than not here, he seems about ready to call it a night."

Track listing

Charts

Weekly charts

Year-end charts

References

2001 albums
Gerald Levert albums
Elektra Records albums